Lee Yong may refer to:

Lee Yong (luger) (born 1978), South Korean luger
Lee Yong (footballer, born 1986), South Korean footballer
Lee Yong (footballer, born 1989), South Korean footballer
Lee Yong (politician) (1888–1954), North Korean politician